A dipper is a passerine bird in the genus Cinclus

Dipper may also refer to:

Literature
Dippers (book), a 1997 children's book by Barbara Nichol and Barry Moser

Objects
Dipper (spoon), a utensil for dipping liquids 
Honey dipper, a wooden utensil with deep grooves for drizzling honey on breadstuff
Part of a steam shovel, power shovel or backhoe which carries the bucket
Dipper (container), a container for oil for painting
Grid dip oscillator or dipper, a resonance frequency measuring instrument
Dipper well, a perpetual-flow sink often used in coffeehouses and ice cream shops

In the military
HMS Dipper, former name of Henstridge Airfield, Henstridge, Somerset, England
, an American World War II minesweeper

People
Robert DiPierdomenico (born 1958), Australian rules footballer and media personality nicknamed Dipper
Alfred Dipper (1885–1945), English cricketer

Other uses
Dipper (Chinese constellation)
An old colloquial term for the New Democratic Party, a Canadian political party
Dipper Pines, a character on the Disney Channel animated series Gravity Falls
Dipper (brand), an Indian condom brand

See also
Big Dipper (disambiguation)
Little Dipper (disambiguation)